HMS Dreadnought was a 60-gun fourth rate ship of the line of the Royal Navy, built according to the 1733 proposals of the 1719 Establishment at Deptford, and was launched on 23 June 1742. Dreadnought served until 1784, when she was sold out of the service.

Retaining her name, Dreadnought operated as a merchant ship after her naval service until she foundered in the English Channel, 3 leagues —  — south of North Foreland, Kent, England, in 1803.

Notes

References

 Lavery, Brian (2003) The Ship of the Line - Volume 1: The development of the battlefleet 1650-1850. Conway Maritime Press. .

External links
 

Ships of the line of the Royal Navy
1742 ships
Ships built in England
Maritime incidents in 1803
Shipwrecks in the English Channel